Dr. Muto is a 2002 platform game developed and published by Midway Games. It was released for the PlayStation 2 and Xbox on November 11, 2002 and later released for the GameCube on December 17, 2002. An entirely different game with the same name was developed by Digital Eclipse and released for the Game Boy Advance on March 21, 2003. This is the last game designed by Ed Logg.

The game follows Dr. Muto, a maniacal and genius mad scientist whose latest experiment has accidentally destroyed his own home planet. In order to rebuild his world, he steals organic matter from neighboring planets. Dr. Muto uses his invention, the Splizz Gun, to mutate and morph into other organisms to complete his tasks. Overall, the game received mixed reviews by critics.

Gameplay 
In the game, Dr. Muto has the ability to morph into many creatures, and use a variety of gadgets to get through the game. Dr. Muto is able to turn into 5 different creatures with the use of the Splizz Gun in the game. These can be unlocked by collecting items like isotopes and animal DNA. These morphs also have special extras. There are seven different gadgets Dr. Muto can use. Players get the Splizz Gun at the start of the game, it allows Dr. Muto to extract DNA from enemies, electrocute and shoot lasers at enemies, and allows him to morph into five different creatures.

Plot 
Dr. Muto, a mad scientist, built a machine that would provide free, renewable energy for his home planet of Midway. However, the machine was sabotaged by Muto's rival, Professor Burnital, causing it to malfunction and destroy the planet. Dr. Muto and his laboratory survived. Now,  Dr. Muto plans to build a machine called the Genitor 9000 that will rebuild Midway. However, the pieces necessary to assemble and run the machine are scattered across a number of neighboring planets and must be collected. There are 4250 isotopes and 86 bits of terra to collect in all; however, due to design issues, some of the game's isotopes are nearly impossible to collect and only 80% of the isotopes are required to complete the game.

Reception 

The game received mixed reviews, garnering a score of 70 on Metacritic. Hilary Goldstein of IGN gave the game an 8.5 out of 10, stating that Muto has "sly humor, difficult challenges, and some fantastic gameplay elements."

References

External links 

  (from the Internet Archive Wayback Machine)
 PS2 | Xbox | GC | GBA at GameSpot

2002 video games
Ed Logg games
Game Boy Advance games
GameCube games
Midway video games
3D platform games
Video games scored by Allister Brimble
PlayStation 2 games
Video games developed in Canada
Video games developed in the United States
Video games set on fictional planets
Xbox games
Digital Eclipse games
Single-player video games